The 1951 U.S. Open was the 51st U.S. Open, held June 14–16 at the South Course of Oakland Hills Country Club in Bloomfield Hills, Michigan, a suburb northwest of Detroit. Ben Hogan won his second consecutive U.S. Open title, two strokes ahead of runner-up Clayton Heafner. Hogan missed the 1949 U.S. Open due to an automobile accident; this was his third title in his last three attempts.

The South Course, dubbed "The Monster," played exceptionally tough for the first three rounds. No player was able to break par the first two days, and Jimmy Demaret's 70 was the only score to equal par in Saturday morning's third round. Sam Snead owned the first round lead at 71 (+1), while Bobby Locke led after the second round at 144 (+4) and shared the lead with Demaret after the third at 218 (+8).

Two strokes back after a 71 in the third round on Saturday morning, Hogan played one of the finest rounds in U.S. Open history that afternoon. Even-par on the front nine, he birdied the 10th and 13th holes. After a bogey at 14, he responded with another birdie at 15. His 287 (+7) was two ahead of Heafner, who shot 69, the only other round under 70. At the trophy presentation, Hogan uttered the famous quote: "I'm glad I brought this course—this monster—to its knees."

This was the first U.S. Open that was notably toughened up by the USGA with narrow fairways and deep rough, attributing to "The Monster" nickname. The course also underwent a redesign by Robert Trent Jones prior to the championship, modifying the original Donald Ross design.

The South Course previously hosted the U.S. Open in 1924 and 1937; the winning score in 1937 was 281, sixteen strokes less than in 1924. It later hosted in 1961, 1985, and 1996, and the PGA Championship in 1972, 1979, and 2008.

Since Hogan repeated as champion in 1951, only Curtis Strange (1988, 1989) and Brooks Koepka (2017, 2018) have won consecutive U.S. Open titles.

Past champions in the field

Made the cut

Missed the cut 

Source:

Round summaries

First round 
Thursday, June 14, 1951

Source:

Second round 
Friday, June 15, 1951

Source:

Third round 
Saturday, June 16, 1951 (morning)

Source:

Final round 
Saturday, June 16, 1951 (afternoon)

Source:

References

External links 

U.S. Open (golf)
Golf in Michigan
Bloomfield Hills, Michigan
U.S. Open
U.S. Open
U.S. Open